Alarcia is a town of northern Spain, Autonomous Community of Castile and León, province of Burgos, Shire of Montes de Oca, sub-shire of Tirón-Rioja Burgalesa, in the municipality of Rábanos. It lies between the reservoir Úzquiza (west) and the peak of San Millan (2,131 m) in the Sierra de la Demanda (southeast).

History
On arrival of the Romans in this area (1st Century AD), It belonged to the territory of Autrigones tribe.

The current shire of Montes de Oca, where is Halariza, Alariza or Alarcia, was repopulated mainly by Astur, Cantabri, Visigothic and Vascones (Basques) origins in the mid-ninth century, although remained border between the County of Castile with the Caliphate of Córdoba and its allies for at least a century. The shire was afterwards border between kingdom of Castile and the kingdom of Navarre till the mid-twelfth century. During this period the shire to which belonged change from one kingdom to another until finally passed to the kingdom of Castile after an award, in 1146.

It appears that the population has its origin in the high-medieval repopulation, but it is not named till 1068 when appears in the endowment document of the episcopal see of Oca that the first king of Castile, Sancho II granted to its Bishop, linking it to Abbey Foncea or Broncea. 
 
It is named in the fuero (charter) of Cerezo, which was granted by Alfonso VII of León and Castile, 10 January 1146, to the town of Cerezo de Río Tirón. Between the 134 villages belonged to the alfoz of Cerezo, appears Halariza next to Valmala and Sancta Crux del Valle (Urbión). 
Named like Alarcia, its first written record, appears in the census of Floridablanca   (1785–1787).

Artistic and natural heritage
 Romanesque church
 Reservoir Úzquiza
Sierra de la Demanda

Parish of San Bartolomé
Is a Romance church dedicated to the La Asunción de Nuestra Señora, employee of the parish of Villasur de Herreros in the Arcipestrazgo of San Juan de Ortega, diocese of Burgos. The church was built between the late 10th century and the 13th century and reformed in the 15th century. Recently recovered (2001,...) by the own diocese.

Culture
 Village festivals The weekend nearest San Bartholomew (24 of August).

Population change
The table below details the population since 1842.

Bibliography
 Sebastián de Miñano y Bedoya Diccionario geográfico-estadístico de España y Portugal Madrid, published by Pierart-Peralta, (1826–1829), 11 vols.
 Don Pascual Madoz Diccionario geográfico-estadístico de España y sus posesiones de ultramar, de 1846

Notes
 Historic series census

References

External links
 Alarcia in the UK Viamichelin Guide
 website of the Provincial delegation of Burgos 
 Rural Tourism Accommodation in Alarcia (Castile and León official tourist website)

Populated places in the Province of Burgos